Aneliya Ivanova Kukunova (born 14 April 1994) is a Bulgarian footballer who plays as a defender. She has been a member of the Bulgaria women's national team.

References

1994 births
Living people
Women's association football defenders
Bulgarian women's footballers
Bulgaria women's international footballers
21st-century Bulgarian women